Meridian LRT station is an elevated Light Rail Transit (LRT) station on the Punggol LRT line East Loop in Punggol, Singapore, located at Punggol Field between the junctions of Edgefield Plains and Edgedale Plains. It was opened on 29 January 2005 together with the Sengkang LRT West Loop.

Etymology

Taken from the name of Punggol Meridian Residents' Committee (RC) located near the station.

References

Railway stations in Singapore opened in 2005
Railway stations in Punggol
Punggol
LRT stations in Punggol
Light Rail Transit (Singapore) stations